Nathalie Descamps (born 5 January 1983 in Bilzen) is a right-handed badminton player from Belgium. Until 2010, she has won 17 Belgian National Badminton Championships. Descamps also won the bronze medal at the 2010 European Badminton Championships in the mixed doubles event partnered with Wouter Claes.

Career
Descamps currently plays for French First Division Club LUC Badminton Lille located in Lille.

She is currently ranked on place 108 (28 September 2008) in the Women's singles world ranking. In Belgium she is ranked number 1.

Descamps was selected for the European Players Olympic Forum 2008 (EPOF). In 2008, she received an invitation from the Badminton World Federation to participate to the 2008 Beijing Olympic Games, but the Belgian Olympic Committee uses different selection criteria and decided not to withhold her selection.

During her international career, she participated in four consecutive European Championships. Her best result was a bronze medal in Mixed doubles (together with partner Wouter Claes) during the 2010 European Badminton Championships. This was the first Belgian medal ever won on a European Championship.

Clubs

Achievements

European Championships
Mixed doubles

BWF International Challenge/Series
Women's doubles

Mixed doubles

 BWF International Challenge tournament
 BWF International Series/European Circuit tournament

National
2002: Winner Belgian National Championship women's doubles (together with partner Veerle Rakels)
2003: Winner Belgian National Championship women's doubles (together with partner Veerle Rakels)
2004: Winner Belgian National Championship women's singles
2005: Winner Belgian National Championship women's singles, women's doubles (together with partner Katrien Claes), and mixed doubles (together with partner Wouter Claes)
2006: Winner Belgian National Championship women's singles, women's doubles (together with partner Sofie Robbrecht), and mixed doubles (together with partner Wouter Claes)
2007: Winner Belgian National Championship women's singles, women's doubles (together with partner Sabine Devooght), and mixed doubles (together with partner Wouter Claes)
2008: Winner Belgian National Championship Women's singles, mixed doubles (together with partner Wouter Claes)
2009: Winner Belgian National Championship women's singles, mixed doubles (together with partner Wouter Claes), winner of the Belgian National Badminton League with her team Webacsa
2010: Winner Belgian National Championship Mixed doubles (together with partner Wouter Claes)

References

External links
 
 Belgian Ranking

Belgian female badminton players
1983 births
Living people
People from Bilzen
Sportspeople from Limburg (Belgium)
21st-century Belgian women